Edward Kent Karslake (1820 – 31 May 1892) was a British Conservative Party politician.

Karslake was educated at Harrow School and Christ Church Oxford - 1st Class Classics BA 1841. He became a fellow of Bailliol College 1840-1850 and practiced as a Barrister from 1846. 
He was elected MP for Colchester at a by-election in 1867 but lost the seat at the next election in 1868.

References

External links
 

Conservative Party (UK) MPs for English constituencies
UK MPs 1865–1868
1820 births
1892 deaths